The Little Muddy River is a  tributary of the Big Muddy River in Illinois. It forms the boundary between Franklin and Perry counties.

Cities and counties
The following cities and towns are drained by the Little Muddy:
Ashley
DuQuoin
Radom

The following counties are partly in the Little Muddy watershed:
Franklin County
Jackson County
Jefferson County
Perry County
Washington County

See also
List of Illinois rivers

References

Rivers of Illinois
Rivers of Franklin County, Illinois
Rivers of Perry County, Illinois